Nadir Ali (Arabic: نادر علی) is a male Muslim given name. Notable people with the name include:

 Nadir Ali (comedian)  (born 1991), Pakistani YouTube personality, Comedian
 Nadir Ali Shah (1897–1974), Pakistani sufi saint of the Qalandariyya

Arabic masculine given names
compound given names